In physics and astronomy, the Reissner–Nordström metric is a static solution to the Einstein–Maxwell field equations, which corresponds to the gravitational field of a charged, non-rotating, spherically symmetric body of mass M. The analogous solution for a charged, rotating body is given by the Kerr–Newman metric.

The metric was discovered between 1916 and 1921 by Hans Reissner, Hermann Weyl, Gunnar Nordström and George Barker Jeffery independently.

The metric
In spherical coordinates ,  the Reissner–Nordström metric (i.e. the line element) is

Here,  is the electric constant.

The total mass of the central body and its irreducible mass are related by

In the limit that the charge  (or equivalently, the length scale ) goes to zero, one recovers the Schwarzschild metric.  The classical Newtonian theory of gravity may then be recovered in the limit as the ratio  goes to zero. In the limit that both  and  go to zero, the metric becomes the Minkowski metric for special relativity.

In practice, the ratio  is often extremely small.  For example, the Schwarzschild radius of the Earth is roughly 9 mm (3/8 inch), whereas a satellite in a geosynchronous orbit has an orbital radius  that is roughly four billion times larger, at 42,164 km (26,200 miles).  Even at the surface of the Earth, the corrections to Newtonian gravity are only one part in a billion. The ratio only becomes large close to black holes and other ultra-dense objects such as neutron stars.

Charged black holes
Although charged black holes with rQ ≪ rs are similar to the Schwarzschild black hole, they have two horizons: the event horizon and an internal Cauchy horizon.  As with the Schwarzschild metric, the event horizons for the spacetime are located where the metric component  diverges; that is, where

This equation has two solutions:

These concentric event horizons become degenerate for 2rQ = rs, which corresponds to an extremal black hole. Black holes with 2rQ > rs cannot exist in nature because if the charge is greater than the mass there can be no physical event horizon (the term under the square root becomes negative). Objects with a charge greater than their mass can exist in nature, but they can not collapse down to a black hole, and if they could, they would display a naked singularity. Theories with supersymmetry usually guarantee that such "superextremal" black holes cannot exist.

The electromagnetic potential is

If magnetic monopoles are included in the theory, then a generalization to include magnetic charge P is obtained by replacing Q2 by Q2 + P2 in the metric and including the term P cos θ dφ in the electromagnetic potential.

Gravitational time dilation 

The gravitational time dilation in the vicinity of the central body is given by

which relates to the local radial escape velocity of a neutral particle

Christoffel symbols 

The Christoffel symbols

with the indices

give the nonvanishing expressions

Given the Christoffel symbols, one can compute the geodesics of a test-particle.

Tetrad form
Instead of working in the holonomic basis, one can perform efficient calculations with a tetrad. Let  be a set of one-forms with internal Minkowski index , such that . The Reissner metric can be described by the tetrad

,

,

where . The parallel transport of the tetrad is captured by the connection one-forms . The connections can be solved for by inspection from Cartan's equation , where the left hand side is the exterior derivative of the tetrad, and the right hand side is a wedge product.

The Riemann tensor  can be constructed as a collection of two-forms by the second Cartan equation  which again makes use of the exterior derivative and wedge product.

Equations of motion 

Because of the spherical symmetry of the metric, the coordinate system can always be aligned in a way that the motion of a test-particle is confined to a plane, so for brevity and without restriction of generality we use θ instead of φ. In dimensionless natural units of G = M = c = K = 1 the motion of an electrically charged particle with the charge q is given by

which yields

All total derivatives are with respect to proper time .

Constants of the motion are provided by solutions  to the partial differential equation

after substitution of the second derivatives given above. The metric itself is a solution when written as a differential equation

The separable equation

immediately yields the constant relativistic specific angular momentum

a third constant obtained from

is the specific energy (energy per unit rest mass)

Substituting  and  into  yields the radial equation 

Multiplying under the integral sign  by  yields the orbital equation

The total time dilation between the test-particle and an observer at infinity is

The first derivatives  and the contravariant components of the local 3-velocity  are related by

which gives the initial conditions

The specific orbital energy

and the specific relative angular momentum

The local velocity is therefore

Alternative formulation of metric
The metric can be expressed in Kerr–Schild form like this:

Notice that k is a unit vector.  Here M is the constant mass of the object, Q is the constant charge of the object, and η is the Minkowski tensor.

Quantum gravitational corrections to the metric
In certain approaches to quantum gravity, the classical Reissner–Nordström metric receives quantum corrections. An example of this is given by the effective field theory approach pioneered by Barvinsky and Vilkovisky. At second order in curvature, the classical Einstein-Hilbert action is supplemented by local and non-local terms:

where  is an energy scale. The exact values of the coefficients  are unknown, as they depend on the nature of the ultra-violet theory of quantum gravity. On the other hand, the coefficients  are calculable.
The operator  has the integral representation

The new additional terms in the action imply a modification of the classical solution. The quantum corrected Reissner–Nordström metric, up to order , was found by Campos Delgado:

  
where

See also
Black hole electron

Notes

References

External links
spacetime diagrams including Finkelstein diagram and Penrose diagram, by Andrew J. S. Hamilton
"Particle Moving Around Two Extreme Black Holes" by Enrique Zeleny, The Wolfram Demonstrations Project.
 

Exact solutions in general relativity
Black holes
Metric tensors